Emilio Brambilla (26 June 1882 – 17 October 1938) was an Italian athlete

Biography
He competed in the 1906 Summer Olympics in Athens and in the 1908 Summer Olympics in London. In 1906 he finished 16th in the standing long jump event and 19th in the ancient pentathlon competition.

Two years later he participated in the 200 metres event he placed fifth and last in his preliminary heat and was eliminated from competition. He also participated in the freestyle javelin event but his result is unknown.

National titles
Emilio Brambilla has won one time the individual national championship.
1 win in 110 metres hurdles (1910)

Bibliography

See also
 Men's high jump Italian record progression

References

External links
 

1882 births
1938 deaths
Athletes from Milan
Italian male sprinters
Italian male hurdlers
Italian male long jumpers
Italian male javelin throwers
Italian male pentathletes
Italian decathletes
Olympic athletes of Italy
Athletes (track and field) at the 1906 Intercalated Games
Athletes (track and field) at the 1908 Summer Olympics